Tryggvi Guðmundsson (born 30 July 1974) is an Icelandic former professional footballer. He is Iceland's all-time top scorer in the Úrvalsdeild. He is the highest scoring male Icelandic footballer of all time in association football with 296 goals credited to his name.

Club career
A prolific striker, Tryggvi started his career at ÍBV before moving abroad to clubs in Norway and Sweden. After an unsuccessful loan spell at Stoke City, he returned to Iceland.

International career
Tryggvi made his debut for Iceland in a July 1997 friendly match against the Faroe Islands, coming on as a second-half substitute for Ríkharður Daðason and scoring the only goal of the match. In 2001, he scored his only hat-trick for his country against India in the Millennium Super Soccer Cup. He has scored twelve goals in 42 appearances, his last appearance coming in a 2–1 away friendly win against Slovakia in March 2008.

Managerial career
Tryggvi was an assistant manager for ÍBV in 2015 and Vængir Júpiters in 2019. In 2021, he was hired as the manager of Kormákur/Hvöt.

Career statistics

Club

International

References

External links
 
 

1974 births
Living people
Tryggvi Gudmundsson
Association football forwards
Tryggvi Gudmundsson
Tryggvi Gudmundsson
Tryggvi Gudmundsson
Tryggvi Gudmundsson
Tryggvi Gudmundsson
Tromsø IL players
Stabæk Fotball players
Örgryte IS players
Tryggvi Gudmundsson
Stoke City F.C. players
Tryggvi Gudmundsson
Eliteserien players
Allsvenskan players
Tryggvi Gudmundsson
Expatriate footballers in Norway
Tryggvi Gudmundsson
Expatriate footballers in Sweden
Tryggvi Gudmundsson
Expatriate footballers in England
Tryggvi Gudmundsson
Tryggvi Gudmundsson
Tryggvi Gudmundsson
Tryggvi Gudmundsson
Tryggvi Gudmundsson